Kent Street may refer to:
Kent Street (Ottawa), Canada
Kent Street, Perth, Australia
Kent Street Senior High School, a school on this street
Kent Street, East Sussex, UK (a hamlet near Sedlescombe)
Kent Street, Kent, UK
Kent Street (Simcoe, Ontario) in Simcoe, Norfolk County, Ontario, Canada
Kent Street station, Brookline, Massachusetts